Zié Mohamed Ouattara (born 9 January 2000) is an Ivorian professional footballer who plays as right-back for Portimonense.

Club career
A youth product of ASEC Mimosas, Ouattara transferred to Vitória S.C. on 30 January 2018. Ouattara made his professional debut with Vitória B in a 3–2 LigaPro loss to F.C. Penafiel on 9 December 2018.

International career
Ouattara debuted for the Ivory Coast U23s in a pair of 2019 Africa U-23 Cup of Nations qualification matches in March 2019.

Honours
Ivory Coast U23
Africa U-23 Cup of Nations: runner-up 2019

References

External links
 
 ZeroZero Profile

2000 births
Living people
Footballers from Abidjan
Ivorian footballers
Association football fullbacks
Ivory Coast under-20 international footballers
Footballers at the 2020 Summer Olympics
Olympic footballers of Ivory Coast
Vitória S.C. players
Vitória S.C. B players
Portimonense S.C. players
Primeira Liga players
Liga Portugal 2 players
Ivorian expatriate footballers
Expatriate footballers in Portugal
Ivorian expatriate sportspeople in Portugal